Charaxes lucretius, the violet-washed charaxes or common red charaxes, is a butterfly in the family Nymphalidae.

Description
Ch. lucretius Cr. male. Wings above black with slight bluish reflection; forewing rust-brown in the cell and at the costal margin, beyond the middle with a nearly straight row of 8 large red-yellow spots and with similar but smaller marginal spots; hindwing beyond the middle with red-yellow, posteriorly narrower discal band and with broad red-yellow marginal band; the under surface red-brown with black transverse streaks in the basal part. In the female both wings above are smoke-brown with common whitish discal band, placed as in the male but much narrower; the marginal spots of the forewing very small or indistinct ; the marginal band of the hindwing much narrower than in the male and whitish with orange-yellow tinge; the base of the costal margin of the forewing only very narrowly red-brown; the under surface lighter than in the male and with whitish discal band, which is broader than above. In the West African forest-region 
from Sierra Leone to Angola and Uganda, widely distributed and very common. 
Similar to Charaxes eudoxus  but the silvery markings on the underside are absent

Taxonomy
Charaxes lucretius group:

Charaxes lucretius
Charaxes octavus
Charaxes odysseus
Charaxes lactetinctus
Charaxes lemosi

Subspecies
C. l. lucretius (Senegal, Guinea, Sierra Leone, Liberia, Ivory Coast, Ghana, Togo, western Nigeria)
C. l. intermedius van Someren, 1971 (Nigeria, Cameroon, Gabon, Congo, Central African Republic, Democratic Republic of the Congo, Zambia)
C. l. maximus van Someren, 1971 (Democratic Republic of the Congo, Uganda, Rwanda, Burundi, western Kenya, north-western Tanzania)
C. l. saldanhai Bivar de Sousa, 1983  (north-western Angola)
C. l. schofieldi Plantrou, 1989 (north-eastern Zambia)

Distribution and habitat
It is found in Senegal, Guinea, Sierra Leone, Liberia, Ivory Coast, Ghana, Togo, Nigeria, Cameroon, Equatorial Guinea, Sao Tome and Principe, Gabon, the Republic of the Congo, Angola, the Central African Republic, the Democratic Republic of the Congo, Uganda, Rwanda, Burundi, Kenya, Tanzania and Zambia. The habitat consists of primary forests.

Biology
Notes on the biology of lucretius are provided by Larsen (2005) and Larsen (1991)

The larvae feed on Annona senegalensis, Hugonia platysepala and Trema species.

References

 Victor Gurney Logan Van Someren, 1971 Revisional notes on African Charaxes (Lepidoptera: Nymphalidae). Part VII. Bulletin of the British Museum (Natural History) (Entomology)181-226.

External links
Images of C. l. intermedius Royal Museum for Central Africa (Albertine Rift Project)
Images of C. l. maximus (Albertine Rift Project)
Charaxes lucretius images at Consortium for the Barcode of Life
C. l. lucretius images at BOLD
C. l. maximus images at BOLD

Butterflies described in 1775
lucretius
Taxa named by Pieter Cramer